Mohamed Yahia Sedki, known as Hamada Sedki (born 25 August 1961) is an Egyptian footballer. He played as a central defender for Al Ahly from 1986 to 1993, winning 25 international caps. Currently, he is a football manager.

References

External links
 

1961 births
Living people
Association football defenders
Egyptian footballers
Egypt international footballers
1984 African Cup of Nations players
1986 African Cup of Nations players
1988 African Cup of Nations players
1990 African Cup of Nations players
Egyptian Premier League players
Al Ahly SC players
Egyptian football managers
Egyptian expatriate football managers
Place of birth missing (living people)
Expatriate football managers in Saudi Arabia
Egyptian expatriate sportspeople in Saudi Arabia
Smouha SC managers
Wadi Degla SC managers
ENPPI SC managers
Expatriate football managers in Sudan
Egyptian expatriate sportspeople in Sudan
Al-Hilal Club (Omdurman) managers
Al-Hazm FC managers
Saudi First Division League managers